The TCDD E32000 is an electric multiple unit railway car built by Hyundai-Rotem for the Turkish State Railways. They were ordered exclusively to operate along the new Marmaray commuter rail network in Istanbul with delivery beginning in 2011. The EMUs consist of 5-car and 10-car sets respectively. The first EMUs went into service along Istanbul's two commuter rail lines from 2012 and 2013. On 29 October 2013, the first 5-car sets began operating between Kazlıçeşme and Ayrılıkçeşmesi as part of Phase I of the Marmaray project.

Hyundai Rotem announced on 11 November 2008, that it had signed a €580 million contract to supply the rolling stock for the Marmaray project. The Korean firm had competition from shortlisted bidders Alstom, CAF, and a consortium of Bombardier, Siemens, and Nurol for the 440-vehicle contract which was placed by the Ministry of Transport's General Directorate of Railways, Harbours, and Airports.

References

Hyundai Rotem multiple units
Marmaray
Turkish railways electric multiple units
25 kV AC multiple units